Mansaba is a Sector in the Oio Region of Guinea-Bissau.

Oio Region
Sectors of Guinea-Bissau
Populated places in Guinea-Bissau